Carnival Magic is a 1927 German silent drama film directed by Rudolf Walther-Fein and Rudolf Dworsky and starring Harry Liedtke, Grete Mosheim, and Emil Rameau. It was shot at the Staaken Studios in Berlin. The film's sets were designed by the art directors Hans Minzloff and Jacek Rotmil.

Cast

References

Bibliography

External links

1927 films
1927 drama films
Films of the Weimar Republic
German silent feature films
German drama films
Films directed by Rudolf Walther-Fein
Films directed by Rudolf Dworsky
German black-and-white films
Silent drama films
1920s German films
Films shot at Staaken Studios